Klyne is a surname (and, more rarely, a given name). Notable people with the name include:

Surname 
 George Klyne (1828–1875), Canadian politician; Member of the Legislative Assembly of Manitoba
 Marty Klyne (born 1957), Canadian senator and former corporate executive
 Michel Klyne (1781–1868), Canadian employee of North West Company and Hudson's Bay Company
 William Klyne (1913–1977), British organic chemist

Given name 
 Klyne Snodgrass (born 1944), American theologian and author

See also 
 Similar surnames: Clain, Clein, Cline, Clyne, Klein, Kleine, Kline